Qillwan Quta (Aymara qillwa, qiwña, qiwlla Andean gull, -n(i) a suffix, quta lake, "lake with gulls", also spelled Kellhuan Khota, Kellhuan Kkota) is a  mountain in the Bolivian Andes. It is located in the La Paz Department, Loayza Province, Luribay Municipality. Qillwan Quta lies northwest of Chuqi Sillani at  a plain named Qillwan Quta Pampa.

References 

Mountains of La Paz Department (Bolivia)